Trimeresurus rubeus, commonly known as the ruby-eyed green pitviper, is a venomous pit viper species endemic to Southeast Asia. It occurs in southern Vietnam and eastern Cambodia. No subspecies are currently recognized.

Trimeresurus rubeus inhabits seasonal tropical forests, including lightly disturbed ones. All specimens have been recorded at night in dense vegetation, often near fast-flowing streams. Although most known populations occur in national parks, it can be threatened by habitat loss and harvesting for food and snake wine.

References

External links
 Images at iNaturalist

rubeus
Snakes of Asia
Reptiles of Cambodia
Snakes of Vietnam
Reptiles described in 2011
Taxa named by Bryan Lynn Stuart